Abingdon railway station was a station which served the town of Abingdon in Oxfordshire, England until 1963.

History

The station was built by the Abingdon Railway, a short branch line at which Abingdon was the terminus and only stop, although this was operated by the Great Western Railway (GWR) from opening on 2 June 1856. The station and yard were built to the broad gauge on land acquired from the Mayor and Aldermen of the Borough of Abingdon on 19 March 1856 at a cost of £472. Seven properties were demolished to make way for the station and yard, including the Plough Inn which was subsequently rebuilt at a different location. The approach to the station from Stert Street had gates and no public right of way was allowed. Station facilities consisted of a single platform covered by a timber train shed. A locomotive shed was built on land which was never formally conveyed to the railway, but later acquired by adverse possession.

The Abingdon Railway was absorbed by the GWR on 15 August 1904. The line passed on to the Western Region of British Railways on nationalisation in 1948, and was then closed to passengers by the British Railways Board in 1963. The branch continued to be used by freight trains (notably for MG Cars) and sporadic passenger excursions, the last of which took place in June 1984. It was also sometimes pressed into service as an overnight stabling point for the Royal Train during royal visits to Oxfordshire, in connection with which the train is known to have stopped at  station on at least one occasion.

The branch track was lifted in the late 1980s. A fraction of the former railway line is now used for a cyclepath, while the station and the adjoining part of the line near the town centre are now occupied by a Waitrose supermarket, parking and other development.

The station featured briefly in a 1963 documentary film made for cinematic release, "High, Wide and Faster" (from the Look at Life series), which examined contemporary developments in road, rail, and sea transport.

Routes

Notes

References

Bibliography

External links
 Station on navigable O.S. map
 Sub Brit site
 GWR Abingdon Branch 
 Track diagram
 Disused stations - with maps and photos

Disused railway stations in Oxfordshire
Former Great Western Railway stations
Railway stations in Great Britain opened in 1856
Railway stations in Great Britain closed in 1963
Railway station
History of Berkshire